In boxing, a check hook is employed to prevent aggressive boxers from lunging in. There are two parts to the check hook. The first part consists of a regular hook. The second, trickier part involves the footwork. As the opponent lunges in, the boxer should throw the hook and pivot on his lead foot and swing his back foot 90 degrees around (turn the corner). If executed correctly, the aggressive boxer will lunge in and sail harmlessly past his opponent like a bull missing a matador. This is rarely seen in professional boxing as it requires a great disparity in skill level to execute.

Floyd Mayweather Jr. demonstrated a picture-perfect example of this punch against Ricky Hatton in their 2007 encounter. Ricky Hatton was caught with the check hook as he was lunging in; Hatton continued forward as he was knocked off balance and proceeded to ram his head into the ring post as Floyd Mayweather stepped out of harm's way. When interviewed, Mayweather stated that he was taught the check hook in the Michigan amateurs.

External links
  Antenne WKA-France – Lexique des boxes pieds-poings (Rubrique "Formations", onglet "Ceinture noire")
  Lexique de Netboxe.com 
  Fiches pratiques de Netboxe.com 
  BoxRec Boxing Encyclopaedia

Movies
 Floyd Mayweather Vs Ricky Hatton Final Round TKO

Boxing terminology
Kickboxing terminology
Punches (combat)